Madhav Dalvi (19 August 1925 – 1 October 2012) was an Indian cricketer. He played first-class cricket for Mumbai and Vidarbha between 1947 and 1962.

References

External links
 

1925 births
2012 deaths
Indian cricketers
Mumbai cricketers
Vidarbha cricketers
Cricketers from Mumbai